My Son is a 2021 mystery thriller film written and directed by Christian Carion. It is an English-language remake of Carion's 2017 French film , and stars James McAvoy and Claire Foy. McAvoy was not supplied with a script or dialogue, and improvises his way through the film.

Plot
Edmond Murray is an absent father who is called to the site of his son Ethan's disappearance. He meets and briefly consoles his ex-wife Joan there, and promptly joins a search party before being interviewed by the police.

After being interviewed by Inspector Roy (the police), Edmond visits his ex-wife's new partner, Frank, and the two begin talking. After seeing that Frank has made plans for a new home for himself and Joan (without bedroom accommodation for Ethan), and upon hearing that Frank has given Joan a Valium tablet to help her sleep, Edmond becomes irate and confrontational, accusing Frank of being responsible for his son's disappearance. He assaults him in the kitchen, knocking him unconscious and calls Inspector Roy to have him look into Frank.

Edmond is arrested but no charges are filed, as Frank is apparently forgiving of Edmond due to his emotional stress at the moment. Edmond is later met by Inspector Roy, who hides Edmond's phone in a microwave oven (so as not to be heard), and informs him that he has been taken off the case without any explanation.

Edmond looks through Frank's phone, which he took after knocking him out, and finds videos of Ethan leading up to the disappearance. During this, he realises there is a car present in both videos, two weeks apart, hidden barely out of sight. Relying on Joan's brother who works in the insurance industry, Edmond obtains the vehicle owner's address, a William O'Connor who lives at an isolated farm.

After arriving at the location, Edmond hears a vehicle approach. Hiding, he grabs a crowbar and eventually knocks out O'Connor, and ties him up to a post in the shed. After an aggressive interrogation involving a blowtorch, O'Connor reveals that he is responsible for sending pictures of children outside of schools to a kidnapping ring operated for paedophiles, who then "choose" which children will be kidnapped. After being told of his son's location, at a hilltop lodge, Edmond drives to near the lodge, continuing on foot to hide his approach.

Joan arrives at the O'Connor farm, and finds another kidnapped girl unconscious in the back of his vehicle; Edmond had not thought to look. She takes the child to the hospital, then leaves when Edmond sends a text telling her where the lodge is, asking her to contact Inspector Roy. She calls Roy as she heads to the lodge herself.

When Edmond reaches the lodge, he sees that three members of the kidnap ring are present. He incapacitates their vehicle, which proves fortuitous, as they were preparing to take an unconscious Ethan away. Edmond knocks out Steven, the kidnapper who was repairing the vehicle. After a game of cat and mouse with kidnappers Alan and Fergus, during which Alan mistakenly shoots Fergus dead, Edmond finds Ethan. By then, Joan has arrived, and the three make a narrow escape. During the escape, Edmond is shot and veers off the road when he loses consciousness. As a vehicle approaches, Joan and Ethan exit, hiding behind a tree before being found by Roy, who takes them to safety.

Sometime later, outdoors and surrounded by water and mountains, Joan and Edmond stand with Ethan as he flies a small remote control quadcopter. Inspector Roy calls out to Edmond, who bids Ethan farewell after promising that he will eventually be back to stay. Roy and Edmond drive off, revealing that the outing had been a courtesy, as Edmond is under arrest for his part in the illegal activities of his company. Roy states that the kidnapping network is being dismantled, with many more arrests pending. He also assures Edmond that the judge will likely take into account the benefit of Edmond's actions during his court cases.

Cast

In addition, Mark Barrett was specifically included in the main credits as the stand-in for Edmond, as compared to merely body double or stunt double for McAvoy.

Production
It was announced in October 2020 that James McAvoy and Claire Foy had been cast to star in the film, which was written and directed by Christian Carion, remaking his 2017 French film of the same name. McAvoy explained during an appearance on The Graham Norton Show that he was not supplied with a script or dialogue, and was made to improvise for himself.

Filming had begun by late October 2020, and filmed throughout Scotland. Filming in Lochaber paused after a positive COVID-19 test.

Release
The film had a joint release between two streaming services; with Peacock on September 15, 2021 and The Roku Channel on December 15, 2021.

Reception
The film received a mixed to negative reception from critics, with criticism towards the thin plot as a result of the improvisational nature. It has a score of 38% on Rotten Tomatoes.

References

External links
 
 
 

2021 films
2021 thriller films
2020s American films
2020s British films
2020s English-language films
2020s German films
2020s mystery thriller films
American mystery thriller films
American remakes of French films
British mystery thriller films
British remakes of French films
English-language German films
Films about missing people
Films directed by Christian Carion
Films shot in Scotland
German mystery thriller films
Peacock (streaming service) original films
STX Entertainment films